Hajia Jumai Bello is a Nigerian media executive. She was the first woman radio executive at the Bauchi's Radio Corporation. She served as the first female Managing Director Bauchi Radio Corporation. She was approved by the former Governor Mohammed Abubakar of Bauchi State. Prior to her appointment as the MD (managing director) of the Corporation, she worked as the Director of News and Current Affairs. In 1982, she graduated from Bayero University, Kano where she studied mass communication.

References 

Nigerian radio people
Radio executives
1941 births
Living people